Tribus is an EP released by Brazilian band Sepultura, in 1999. It is made up of demos and remixes of songs found on the full-length album Against. The song "The Waste" is an alternate version of the song "Kamaitachi" from the album Against, featuring Mike Patton of Faith No More on vocals. "The Waste" and "Common Bonds (alternate mix)" were also features as B-sides on the "Against" single, which also has the same artwork as the "Tribus" E.P. "Prenúncio" is a recording of Zé do Caixão's introduction of the band which used to precede their live performances. Another recording of this can be found on the band's second live album, Live in São Paulo.

Track listing
 "The Waste (with Mike Patton)" – 3:39  
 "Tribus (demo)" – 1:45
 "Common Bonds (alternate mix)" – 3:04    
 "Unconscious (demo)" – 3:42
 "F.O.E. (extended mix)" – 3:04  
 "Prenúncio" – 5:08

Personnel
Derrick Green – lead vocals, rhythm guitar
Igor Cavalera – drums
Andreas Kisser – lead guitar
Paulo Jr. – bass
Produced by Howard Benson and Sepultura
Recorded and engineered by Carlo Bartolini
Mixed by Tim Palmer at Scream Studios, Studio City, California, USA 
Mixed by Howard Benson and Bobbie Brooks at The Gallery, Encino, California, USA
Mix assisted by James Saez and Mark Moncrief
Assistant engineered by David Bryant, Daniel Mantovani, Tosh Kasai, and James Bennett
Tape Op by Skye A.K. Correa

Charts

References

Sepultura albums
1998 EPs
Albums produced by Howard Benson
Sepultura songs